Luciobrama macrocephalus, the long spiky-head carp, is a species of cyprinid fish that is found in China and Vietnam.  It is the only member of its genus, and is classified as data deficient by the IUCN. It is found in rivers and lakes. Larger fish, over  live nearer the bottom and the smaller specimens are found higher in the water column. They are partially migratory. It has not been recorded from its spawning sites since 1988.

References

Cyprinid fish of Asia
Freshwater fish of China
Fish described in 1803